The European Parliament election of 2019 took place in Italy on 26 May 2019.

In Piedmont Lega Nord came first with 37.1% of the vote (country-level result 34.3%), virtually 15pp more than the Democratic Party, which came second with 23.9%. The Five Star Movement came third with 13.3%, ahead of Forza Italia (9.1%), Brothers of Italy (6.0%), More Europe (3.3%), Green Europe (2.3%) and The Left (1.5%).

Results

References

Elections in Piedmont
European Parliament elections in Italy
2019 European Parliament election
2019 elections in Italy